Reidar is a Scandinavian male given name of Old Norse origins. As of 2013, there are 6,850 people with this name in Norway, 1,519 in Sweden and 108 in Finland. In Estonia there are 5 Reidars and in Italy there's only one. The namesday is July 28 in Norway and May 9 in Sweden. The name Reidar, "hreidr" + "arr" means home and warrior.

Notable people
 Reidar Alveberg (1916–2004), Norwegian bobsledder
 Reidar Andersen, Norwegian ski jumper
 Reidar Åsgård, Norwegian politician
 Reidar Aulie, Norwegian artist
 Reidar Berg, Norwegian bobsledder
 Reidar Børjeson, Norwegian figure skater
 Reidar Carlsen, Norwegian politician
 Reidar Eide, Norwegian motorcyclist
 Reidar Finsrud, Norwegian artist
 Reidar Hirsti, Norwegian editor and politician
 Reidar Hjermstad, Norwegian cross country skier
 Reidar Holter, Norwegian rower
 Reidar Horghagen, Norwegian drummer, also known as Horgh
 Reidar Jørgensen, Norwegian runner and botanist
 Reidar Kjellberg, Norwegian art historian and museum director
 Reidar Kvammen, Norwegian footballer
 Reidar T. Larsen, Norwegian politician
 Reidar Liaklev, Norwegian speed skater
 Reidar Lorentzen, Norwegian javelin thrower
 Reidar Martiniuson, Norwegian sailor
 Reidar Merli, Norwegian wrestler
 Reidar Ødegaard, Norwegian cross country skier
 Reidar Omang, Norwegian historian, librarian and archivist
 Reidar Raaen, Norwegian cyclist
 Reidar Särestöniemi, Finnish painter
 Reidar Skår, Norwegian musician
 Reidar Sørensen, Norwegian actor
 Reidar Strømdahl, Norwegian politician
 Reidar Tønsberg, Norwegian gymnast

Fictional characters
 Reidar Dahlén, the main character of the Swedish TV series Rederiet
 Reidar Vincent Tollefsen, a Norwegian teenager growing up in the late 1980s, portrayed by comedian and actor Øivind Blunck

References

Norwegian masculine given names